Walter Nelson McBride (27 November 1904 – 30 January 1974) was an English first-class cricketer who played for Oxford University and Hampshire. He was a left-handed batsman who bowled right-arm medium pace.

McBride was educated at Westminster School, where he captained the school cricket team in 1924 and was singled out for praise by Wisden Cricketers' Almanack as "the best player in the eleven", and a bowler whose "pace is quite fast".

McBride made his first-class debut for Oxford University in the 1925 season against Middlesex at University Parks, Oxford. He played 16 first-class matches for Oxford University between 1925 and 1928, with his final match for the University coming in the 1928 season against the Marylebone Cricket Club. In McBride's 16 first-class matches for the University he scored 251 runs at a batting average of 11.40, with a single half century score of 51 against Free Foresters in 1927. With the ball, McBride took 32 wickets for the University at a bowling average of 27.81, with two five wicket hauls and best figures of 5/57 against the Free Foresters in 1926. In the field McBride took 12 catches. McBride was awarded a Blue for cricket in 1926.

While representing Oxford University, McBride simultaneously represented Hampshire, making his debut for the county in the 1925 County Championship against Somerset. McBride represented Hampshire in 31 first-class matches from 1925 to 1929, with his final appearance for the county coming in the 1929 County Championship against Derbyshire at the United Services Recreation Ground, Portsmouth. In his Hampshire matches McBride scored 405 runs at a batting average of 13.96, with a high score of 35, took 24 wickets at a bowling average of 37.54, with best figures of 3/36 and made 19 catches.

In 1938 McBride made a single Minor Counties Championship appearance for Dorset against Devon.

In addition to cricket, McBride also played football for Oxford University A.F.C., where he played as a goalkeeper.

He died at Ealing, Middlesex on 30 January 1974.

References

External links
Walter McBride at Cricinfo
Walter McBride at CricketArchive
Matches and detailed statistics for Walter McBride

1904 births
1974 deaths
Footballers from Croydon
People educated at Westminster School, London
Alumni of Christ Church, Oxford
English cricketers
Oxford University cricketers
Hampshire cricketers
Dorset cricketers
English footballers
Oxford University A.F.C. players
Association football goalkeepers